is a passenger railway station located in the town of Misato, Saitama, Japan, operated by the East Japan Railway Company (JR East).

Lines

Station layout
The station is unstaffed and consists of one side platform serving a single track. The station is unattended.

History
The station opened on 25 January 1933. With the privatization of Japanese National Railways (JNR) on 1 April 1987, the station came under the control of JR East.

Passenger statistics
In fiscal 2010, the station was used by an average of 119 passengers daily (boarding passengers only).

Surrounding area
Misato Town Hall
Misato Post Office
Misato Junior High School
Matsuhisa Junior High School

See also
 List of railway stations in Japan

References

External links

 JR East station information 

Railway stations in Japan opened in 1933
Stations of East Japan Railway Company
Railway stations in Saitama Prefecture
Hachikō Line
Misato, Saitama (town)